The third season of Myanmar Idol premiered on April 17, 2018 and continued until August 11, 2018. It was won by Phyo Myat Aung. The third season was co-hosted by Kyaw Htet Aung, the latter of whom left the show after the season ended.

Regional auditions
Auditions were held in Mandalay, Taunggyi, Magwe, Pathein, and Yangon from January to February 2018, and around 10,000 attended the auditions.

Structure of auditions
There are usually two stages in the audition process. The first round is casting round and they sing in front the executive producers and more are eliminated. In the second round those who survive the first stage sing in front of the judges and this is the audition shown on television. Those who gain at least three "yes" votes from the four judges then receive a golden ticket to Golden Week.

Golden Week
It featured three rounds: Round 1, Group Round, and Solo Round.  In the first round, each contestant sang individually, and after they sang, they gathered in a line. Those who impressed the judges advanced to the next round where the contestants performed in groups of four or five, singing a song together. The remaining auditionees who passed the group rounds performed their final solos to advance in the Green Mile.

Green Mile
Color key:

Top 11 Finalists and stages
Nan Shwe Yee, Swan Pyae Aung, Nilen, Ngwe Zin Hlaine, Naw Jas, May Madi, Phyo Myat Aung, Pyae Phyo, Zaw Gyi, Nay Khant Min Thit, ChanMyae MgCho.

Color key:

Week 1: Top 11 –

Week 2: Top 10 – Retro Music

Week 3: Top 8 – Khine Htoo's songs

Week 4: Top 7 – Rainy season songs

Week 5: Top 6 – Latin Music
No elimination because Nay Khant Min Thit was saved by judges.

Week 6: Top 6 – Rock Music
Double elimination because Nay Khant Min Thit was saved by judges in previous week.

Week 7: Top 4 + Wild Card winner – Jazz Music
Double elimination because Zaw Gyi was returned by Wild Card.

Week 8: Top 3 – Hits songs and Duet with star

Week 9: Finale
ChanMyae MgCho didn't participate in grand finale because of health problem. So Phyo Myat Aung automatically won the first prize. But she performed with one song (winner song) in late time.

Elimination Chart

References

Burmese music
Myanmar Idol
2018 television seasons